Alayi Igboji-Akuru Community is a suburban town in the Bende local government area of Abia State, Nigeria. The Community consisted of four main clans of Akoliufu, Amankalu, Ugwueke and Ezeukwu. Alayi is one of the communities that make up Umunnato (Item-Okpi, Alayi Igboji-Akuru, and Igbere-Ebiri) all in Bende LGC. Alayi is divided into two sections, Akoliufu and Amankalu.

Demographics
Many of its people are from Bende local government area of Abia State. But people of other ethnic origins, as well as some foreign nationals from Ghana, Togo and other countries also live and work in Alayi.

Constituencies and neighbouring areas
Alayi is divided into two major constituencies, Amankalu and Akoliufu, with 5 autonomous communities in each of them. The autonomous communities in Akoliufu are: Amaeke, Amaoku/Amaukwu, Agboakoli, Umenyere and Etitialayi. The autonomous communities in Amankalu are: Isiaku, Etiti Ama Elu, Amaokwe-elu, Amaigwu and Okpufu/Amautazi.
Alayi is bordered by Item, Igbere, Umuhu, Akoli, Ozuitem, Isuikwuato, Ezeukwu and Ugwueke.

Mode of governance
Alayi is governed by Igboji of Alayi (Igbojiakuru) with the help of other traditional rulers and their Council of Chiefs. There is also the youth movement called "Uke Ọza Ama" which helps to keep the youths under control and also sees to the cleanliness of the village. This group disciplines any child that gets beyond the control of his/her parents, thereby helping other children to behave well.

History of government and leaders
Historically, Alayi like many other Igbo communities, did not have a king. But the supreme leadership role of all the Alayi clans was maintained by the oldest elder in the Umuirem clan. The Umuirem clan is found in both Amaeke Alayi and Amankalu Alayi communities.

In the 20th century, upon arrival of the European missionaries and Western colonialism, the warrant chieftaincy role was given to Mazi Okereke Aka which later translated to pseudo-kingship. The ruler of Alayi is given the title of Igboji. The Amaeke community is the only community that did not become autonomous and retains the name Alayi in its royal status. All nine villages that make up Alayi have "Onu-mkpu" (a centre) at Eke Akoli in Amaeke Alayi, symbolizing the origin of each village. The immediate past rulers of Alayi since the first warrant chief include Eze (His Royal Majesty) Ukeje Aka, the father of Eze Okereke Aka (a.k.a. Okereke Nne-Ote) the uncle of Eze Onwukwe Onwukwe. (During the late 1960s when Eze Okereke Aka became ill and was incapacitated, he appointed Chief Okereke Elendu (a.k.a. Okom Ikpo) to head his council, and he was succeeded by Chief Edward Okorie (a.k.a. Okorie Emeri) after he died. Chief Edward Okorie headed the council until Okereke Nne-Ote died and thereafter. Chief Edward Okorie is the father of Chief Chekwas Okorie.

Upon the death of Eze Okereke Nne-Ote, his son Chief Nwosu Okereke was appointed to take over the position of Igboji. However, he declined the offer, and it passed to his cousin Eze Onwukwe S. Onuwkwe who reigned until his death in 2008. Eze Onwukwe Onwukwe was buried in December 2008.

The people of Ndi Elendu Royal family nominate one of their illustrious sons to take over the staff of Igbojiakuru of Alayi. In December 2019, Eze Ukeje Philip was crowned to assume the staff of Igbojiakuru of Alayi.

There has been a controversy regarding the status of Amaeke and Igboji in general. The Amaeke are not autonomous like other communities that make up Alayi because Amaeke Alayi was the seat of government in Alayi during the partition of the autonomous communities.

Traditional rulers

Culture
Many Alayi people are traders and industrialists in Aba and Lagos, as well as the used clothing importation business in countries like Republic of Benin, Togo, Ivory Coast and Ghana.  In recent times, Alayi has produced many professionals including academics, lawyers, doctors, and accountants. The most common religion is Christianity and are predominantly catholics

Alayi has a very rich culture, which is reflected not only in their language and food but also in dances, group formations, and festivals. The people have norms, customs and practices that have endured over time through which conflicts are controlled and resolved. The New Yam Festival is the most popular, Nx is celebrated in August with many dances including Ọkọnkọ, Ekpo, Ọbọnị and Akpanikọ. These dances are exclusively for men. There are also many other seasonal dances like Ikoro, Ajọnkwụ (Amaeke), Edere (Umuenyere) Lụghụlụghụ (Amaọkụ/Amaukwụ) Ịgwansi (Amakwụ), Enyom (Elugwu and Obuchie Amankalu), Aka Ọkụkụ (Ezi Alayi), Omume Anyụ (Amaigwu, Amankalu), Oborri (Umuezike Amankalu).

Ụmụagbala Amautazi Amankalu Alayi is also a community in Alayi which observes a unique culture known as Ekete. This is performed by playing a particular drum by men, performing magical acts (spiritism) and dancing. During this festival women and children are regarded as observers. This festival is observed during the New Yam Festival (precisely two days after eating the new yam. This community is bordered by Ndịọtai and has what is known as (Ikwu) which are Ndiokereke, Ndịọtai, and Ụmụachọm. Their old men worship an idol god known as (Ọgbaegbu) discovered by their forefathers. Allegiance to this deity is deteriorating through the influence of Christianity.

References
– Abia State of Nigeria - Website
– Abia State of Nigeria - A Profile
 – Abia State Background Information
 – Alayi Development Union - Community Organisation
– Alayi (Igboji), Bende local government area, Abia State, Nigeria (General,), Nigeria Geography Population Map, cities, coordinates, location - Tageo.com
 – Federal Nigerian Army Blunders of the Nigerian Civil War

Populated places in Abia State